The Wisconsin Flyway Conference is a high school athletic conference in East Central Wisconsin. It has existed in many forms over the years being known as the East Central Flyway Conference and was split into two divisions (the Lakes and the Rivers) in the early to mid-2000s. With the mass realignment of conferences in Northeastern Wisconsin, several teams were removed from the conference, it was reduced to one division and the name was changed to the Wisconsin Flyway Conference.

Current members

Associate members

See also
 List of high school athletic conferences in Wisconsin

External links
http://www.wisconsinflywayconference.org

Wisconsin high school sports conferences
High school sports conferences and leagues in the United States